Kirby Building Systems is a manufacturing company specialising in pre-engineered buildings. It was established in 1976 and is a wholly owned subsidiary of Alghanim Industries. Kirby has manufacturing facilities in Kuwait, Ras Al Khaimah, Hyderabad, Haridwar and Vietnam with a production capacity of over 400,000 MT per year. It has sales offices in 70 countries.

History
Kirby was established as a joint venture between Alghanim and Kirby Building Systems Inc. (Nucor), USA in 1976 with a production plant in Kuwait. In 1981 it built the largest textile complex in the world in Alam, Egypt. In 1996 it received ISO 9001:2000 quality certification. In 2000, the plant in Hyderabad was opened; one year later Kirby India received ISO 9001:2000 certification. In 2006 a plant in Haridwar was inaugurated with a capacity of 60,0000 MT. The plant had an investment of Rs 50 crore (500 million Rupees). A year later another plant was inaugurated in Ras Al Khaimah and construction started on a plant in Vietnam. In 2009 the company reintroduced curved steel structures, an alternative style to other PEB buildings.

Engineering & Manufacturing Capabilities
Kirby centralized its systems, performance, people and products.  Kirby has over 500 people using software for designs and structural detailing as part of the Center of Engineering Excellence (CEE) in Hyderabad in India. Kirby has a total of five manufacturing facilities located in Kuwait, Ras-Al-Khaimah (UAE), Vietnam and India, with a total annual capacity of approximately 400,000 MT, supported by over 4,000 employees. The company operates through 70 sales offices located across six geographical regions, including the Gulf Cooperation Council (GCC), the rest of Middle East, the Indian subcontinent, Africa, Eastern Europe and South East Asia. Globally, Kirby has more than 300 certified builders for the installation of steel buildings. Kirby has manufactured more than 65,000 buildings across the globe, including the world’s single largest PEB building, the Renault Nissan factory in India.

Landmark Projects
Some of the projects the company has executed include: 
Renault-Nissan, India:  World's single largest PEB at one single location involving over 20,000MT of steel and spread over an area of 300,000 sqm. 
Marina Mall, Kuwait: Bridge 
Pipavav Shipyard Ltd., India: One of the largest ship building facilities built with a height of 40m.
AFCON Marine Jetty, UAE: Structural Steel 
Panasonic Factory, Vietnam: One of the largest facilities in Vietnam 
Toshiba-JSW, India: Unique structure consisting of a single 500 MT crane.
Emma Mall, Bahrain: Curved Roof. 
Hindustan National Glass, India: World's largest container glass manufacturing facility
Universal Arwa printing Press, Kuwait: Aesthetically elegant structure 
Hansen Drives, India: World's largest wind turbine gear box manufacturing facility
Safat Alghanim, Kuwait: Commercial Building
Danieli India Ltd., India:  Complex structure with 42 nos of cranes running across different directions.
Delhi Metro, India: First of its type with curved rafters and the first metro rail to use PEB technology.
Bangalore Metro, India: Infrastructure Building 
Truong Hai Auto, Vietnam: Commercial Building

References

Further reading
The Economic Times
Business Standard
Business Standard
The Hindu
The Hindu
The Hindu
The Hindu
Prefabrication in Developing Countries: a case study of India. University of Utah. p. 49.
Trade Arabia

External links
 

Construction and civil engineering companies of India
Industries in Hyderabad, India
Construction and civil engineering companies established in 1976
Indian companies established in 1976
Kuwaiti companies established in 1976